Kirk Franklin is a contemporary gospel singer, author, and leader of urban contemporary choirs such as The Family, Nu Nation, God's Property, and 1NC (One Nation Crew). He has been honored with numerous awards and nominations for his work in music.

American Music Awards

Dove Awards
The Dove Awards are awarded annually by the Gospel Music Association.

Grammy Awards
The Grammy Awards are awarded annually by the National Academy of Recording Arts and Sciences (NARAS).

!
|-
| 1997
| Whatcha Lookin' 4 (Kirk Franklin & The Family)
| Best Contemporary Soul Gospel Album
| 
|
|-
| rowspan="4"|1998
| God's Property
| Best Gospel Choir or Chorus Album
| 
|
|-
| rowspan="2"|"Stomp"
| Best R&B Performance by a Duo or Group with Vocals
| 
| 
|-
| Best R&B Song
| 
| 
|-
| Himself
| Producer of the Year, Non-Classical
| 
|
|-
| rowspan="4"|1999
| The Nu Nation Project
| Best Contemporary Soul Gospel Album
| 
|
|-
| rowspan="3"|"Lean on Me"
| Song of the Year
| 
|
|-
| Best R&B Song
| 
|
|-
| Best R&B Performance by a Duo or Group with Vocals
| 
|
|-
| 2006
| "Looking For You"
| Best Gospel Performance
| 
|
|-
| rowspan="2"| 2007
| "Imagine Me"
| Best Gospel Song
| 
|
|-
| Hero
| Best Contemporary R&B Gospel Album
| 
|
|-
| rowspan="2"| 2009
| "Help Me Believe"
| Best Gospel Song
| 
|
|-
| The Fight of My Life
| Best Contemporary R&B Gospel Album
| 
|
|-
| rowspan="2"| 2012
| "Hello Fear"
| Best Gospel Song
| 
|
|-
| Hello Fear
| Best Gospel Album 
| 
|
|-
| 2015
| "Love on the Radio"
| Best Gospel Performance/Song
| 
| 
|-
| 2016
| "Wanna Be Happy?"
| Best Gospel Performance/Song
| 
|
|-
| rowspan="4"| 2017
|rowspan="2"| "Ultralight Beam" (with Kanye West, Chance the Rapper, The-Dream and Kelly Price)
| Best Rap Song
| 
| rowspan="4"|
|-
| Best Rap/Sung Performance
| 
|-
| "God Provides"
| Best Gospel Performance/Song
| 
|-
| Losing My Religion
| Best Gospel Album
| 
|-
|  rowspan="2"|2019
| "Never Alone" (shared with Tori Kelly)
| Best Gospel Performance/Song
| 
|
|-
| "Hiding Place"
| Best Gospel Album
| 
|
|-
| rowspan="2"| 2020
| "Love Theory"
| Best Gospel Performance/Song
| 
|
|-
| "Long Live Love"
| Best Gospel Album
| 
|
|-
| rowspan="3"| 2023
| "Kingdom" 
| Best Gospel Performance/Song
| 
| rowspan="3"|
|-
| "Fear Is Not My Future" 
| Best Contemporary Christian Music Performance/Song
| 
|-
| Kingdom Book One 
| Best Gospel Album
|

NAACP Image Awards

Stellar Awards

Urban Music Awards

Soul Train Awards

References

Christian music lists
Franklin, Kirk